Scardinius knezevici is a species of ray-finned fish in the family Cyprinidae.
It is found in Lakes Ohrid and Skadar in Albania, Macedonia, and Montenegro.

References

Scardinius
Fish described in 2005